The 2005 LPGA Championship was the 51st LPGA Championship, played June 9–12 at Bulle Rock Golf Course in Havre de Grace, Maryland. This was the second of four major championships on the LPGA Tour in 2005.

Two-time defending champion Annika Sörenstam won for the third consecutive year, three strokes ahead of runner-up Michelle Wie, a 15-year-old amateur. It was the ninth of Sörenstam's ten major titles, and was also consecutive major wins, as she won the Kraft Nabisco Championship by eleven strokes in March.

Wie's inclusion created some controversy, as the event was traditionally for professionals only; she turned pro four months later in October.

Starting with this edition, the LPGA Championship was played at Bulle Rock for five consecutive years, through 2009; the previous eleven were held in nearby Delaware at DuPont Country Club in Wilmington.

Past champions in the field

Made the cut

Source:

Missed the cut

Source:

Final leaderboard
Sunday, June 12, 2005

Source:

Amateur: Michelle Wie (−8)

References

External links
Golf Observer leaderboard

Women's PGA Championship
Golf in Maryland
LPGA Championship
LPGA Championship
LPGA Championship
LPGA Championship